Anne Denholm is a Welsh harpist  born in Carmarthenshire, who held the position of Official Harpist to the Prince of Wales from 2015 to 2019.

Education
Denholm was educated at Ysgol Gynradd y Dderwen and Ysgol Gyfun Gymraeg Bro Myrddin. She then went on to study at the Junior Department of the Royal Welsh College of Music & Drama, the Purcell School and Newnham College, Cambridge University.

Denholm received her Master's in 2015 from the Royal Academy of Music (RAM) with distinction, graduating with the Renata Scheffel-Stein Harp Prize, the Sir Reginald Thatcher prize and a Regency Award for notable achievement. Whilst at the Royal Academy, she was the first harpist to win the historic RAM Club Prize, twice winner of the Skaila Kanga Harp Prize, and holder of a Headley Trust Award and the John Thomas Scholarship.

Career
In July 2015 she was appointed Official Harpist to His Royal Highness The Prince of Wales, the fifth artist to hold this position since its reinstatement in 2000.

Denholm is a founding member of contemporary quartet, The Hermes Experiment, who regularly commission new works and arrangements for their idiosyncratic combination of instruments (clarinet, soprano voice, harp and double bass), as well as performing live free improvisation.

On 19 May 2018, Denholm had the honour of performing at the wedding of Prince Harry and Meghan Markle.

References

1991 births
Living people
Welsh harpists
People from Carmarthen
Alumni of Newnham College, Cambridge
Alumni of the Royal Welsh College of Music & Drama
Women harpists
Welsh women musicians
21st-century Welsh musicians
21st-century British women musicians
Members of the Household of the Prince of Wales